The 1974–75 AHL season was the 39th season of the American Hockey League. Ten teams were scheduled to play 76 games each in the schedule. The Baltimore Clippers suspended operations after 46 games, when displaced by the Baltimore Blades of the World Hockey Association. The Providence Reds finished first overall in the regular season. The Springfield Indians won their fourth Calder Cup championship.

Team changes
 The Boston Braves cease operations.
 The Jacksonville Barons cease operations. The franchise license is sold to an ownership group in Syracuse, New York.
 The Cincinnati Swords cease operations, replaced by the Cincinnati Stingers of the World Hockey Association.
 The Syracuse Eagles join the AHL as an expansion team, based in Syracuse, New York, playing in the South Division.
 The Springfield Kings revert to their previous name, the Springfield Indians.

Final standings
Note: GP = Games played; W = Wins; L = Losses; T = Ties; GF = Goals for; GA = Goals against; Pts = Points;

†Suspended operations.

Scoring leaders

Note: GP = Games played; G = Goals; A = Assists; Pts = Points; PIM = Penalty minutes

 complete list

Calder Cup playoffs

Trophy and award winners
Team awards

Individual awards

Other awards

See also
List of AHL seasons

References
AHL official site
AHL Hall of Fame
HockeyDB

 
American Hockey League seasons
3
3